Gargaphia condensa is a species of lace bug in the family Tingidae which lives in North America.

References

Further reading

 
 

Tingidae
Articles created by Qbugbot
Insects described in 1919